Coelorrhina hornimani is a species of flower beetle belonging to the family Scarabaeidae.

Description
The basic colour is  metallic green colour. The male has a short T-shaped prominence on the forehead.

Distribution
This species can be found in Cameroon.

References
 Universal Biological Indexer
 Biolib
 Global species

External links
 Photos of Coelorrhina hornimani

Cetoniinae
Beetles described in 1877